
Year 580 (DLXXX) was a leap year starting on Monday (link will display the full calendar) of the Julian calendar. The denomination 580 for this year has been used since the early medieval period, when the Anno Domini calendar era became the prevalent method in Europe for naming years.

Events 
 By place 

 Byzantine Empire 
 The Roman Senate sends an embassy to Constantinople, with a gift (3,000 pounds of gold) to Emperor Tiberius II Constantine, along with a plea for help against the Lombards.
 The Slavs begin to migrate into the Balkan Peninsula. The Avars, under King (khagan) Bayan I, invade the Lower Danube (modern Bulgaria).
 Siege of Sirmium: The Avars march to the right bank of the River Sava, and besiege the Byzantine stronghold of Sirmium (Pannonia).

 Europe 
 The Lombards drive the last Ostrogoths across the Alps (Northern Italy). During the "Rule of the Dukes" the Lombards adopt Roman titles, names, and traditions.
 King Liuvigild calls for an Arian synod in Toledo (central Spain), which modifies several doctrines; he tries to unify the Christians within the Visigothic Kingdom.  

 Britain 
 Æthelberht succeeds his father Eormenric as king (bretwalda) of Kent (approximate date).

 Asia 
 The Northern Zhou Dynasty, strategically based in the basin of the Wei River, is supreme in Northern China. In the south only the Chen Dynasty remains a rival.
 The Chinese city of Ye (Henan) is razed to the ground by Yang Jian, future founder of the Sui Dynasty, who defeats a resistance force under Yuchi Jiong.

 By topic 
 Religion 
 Gregory of Tours is brought before a council of bishops, on charges of slandering the Frankish queen Fredegund (approximate date).

Births 
 Abdel Rahman ibn Awf, companion of Muhammad
 Bilal ibn Rabah al-Habashi, companion of Muhammad
 Cadfan ap Iago, king of Gwynedd (approximate date)
 Clemen ap Bledric, king of Dumnonia (approximate date)
 Dayi Daoxin, Chán Buddhist patriarch (d. 651)
 Didier of Cahors, Frankish bishop (approximate date)
 Fabia Eudokia, Byzantine empress (approximate date)
 Livinus, Irish apostle (approximate date)
 Maximus the Confessor, monk and theologian (d. 662)
 Pepin the Elder, Frankish Mayor of the Palace (d. 640)
 Umm Salama, wife of Muhammad (approximate date)  
 Wei Zheng, chancellor of the Tang Dynasty (d. 643)

Deaths 
 Audovera, wife of Chilperic I (approximate date)
 Bacurius III, king of Iberia (Georgia)
 Eormenric, king of Kent (approximate date)
 Galam Cennalath, king of the Picts
 Gao Anagong, high official of Northern Qi
 Martin of Braga, missionary and archbishop
 Wei Xiaokuan, general of Western Wei (b. 509)
 Xuan Di, emperor of Northern Zhou (b. 559)
 Yuchi Jiong, general of Northern Zhou

References